Mathias Månsson is a Swedish professional ice hockey player who currently plays for KalPa of the SM-liiga.

References

External links

Living people
KalPa players
Year of birth missing (living people)
Swedish ice hockey forwards